Leona Kate Vaughan (born 13 February 1995) is a Welsh actress from Caerphilly, South Wales. She has attended the Mark Jermin Stage School. She starred in CBBC's television series Wolfblood as Jana and in Stella as Cerys.

Filmography

Awards and nominations

References

External links
 
 

1996 births
21st-century Welsh actresses
Living people
People from Caerphilly
Welsh film actresses
Welsh television actresses